John Kennedy Barton (April 7, 1853 – December 23, 1921) was a rear admiral in the United States Navy.

Biography 
Born in Philadelphia, Barton graduated from the United States Naval Academy in 1873.

After supervising the fitting out of the gunboat  and cruiser , Barton became a chief engineer on January 15, 1895. Barton returned to the Asiatic Station in 1900 and served on the cruiser  and the battleship  before becoming fleet engineer in 1903. Relieved shortly afterward, he again taught at the Naval Academy until 1905 and then did graduate work in engineering.

In 1907 Barton became head of the department of steam engineering at the Philadelphia Navy Yard. On December 21, 1908, he assumed the title of engineer-in-chief as Chief of the Bureau of Steam Engineering with the rank of rear admiral. Only two days later, Barton was detached to return home due to illness and was simultaneously transferred to the navy's retired list. He subsequently held a post on a Naval Examining Board in January 1909, and also served in the Civil Service Commission. He died at the Naval Hospital at League Island, Philadelphia, on December 23, 1921.

Two ships have been named  for him.

External links 
 

1853 births
1921 deaths
Military personnel from Philadelphia
United States Naval Academy alumni
United States Navy rear admirals (lower half)